Robbie Rotten is a fictional character and the main antagonist of the Icelandic children's program LazyTown. He is also the series' primary comic relief character. He is a ruthless, selfish and lazy, yet goofy, eccentric and silly supervillain, and the arch-nemesis of the series' main protagonists, Sportacus and Stephanie, who promote exercise, healthy eating and an active and healthy lifestyle. As for Robbie, his favorite pastimes include eating junk food and watching TV. Robbie has fair skin, green-grey eyes, and black hair. He usually wears a two-piece suit of maroon and purple with gold pinstripes, formal shoes, a navy blue shirt with cuffs and cuff links. He is the tallest character.

Being extremely lazy, Robbie naturally opposes their attempts to spread a healthy influence to the people of LazyTown and employs various schemes, often involving the use of disguises, to discredit healthy living and run Sportacus (whom he refers to as "Sportaflop") out of LazyTown in every episode, although his plans are always foiled in the end. Ironically, Robbie becomes very active when he executes his plans. He was based on his incarnation from the original musical and played by Stefán Karl Stefánsson on the Nickelodeon/Cartoonito/Sprout TV show.

History
In the second Icelandic stage play, the character was called Glanni Glæpur and, when he arrived at the town, he wore a completely black outfit; but, when he was disguised as Rikki Riki (a very wealthy man), he wore a purple coat, purple pants and shoes that are similar to those that Robbie wears in the television series—although at that point he did not yet have his hair covered in gel. In the television series, Robbie Rotten usually wears a two-piece suit of red and purple with gold pinstripes, formal shoes, a navy blue shirt with cuffs and cuff links, blue and red striped socks and black shoes with black soles.

Robbie Rotten's song "You Are a Pirate" was Stefán Karl's favorite song on the show to perform. Since 2007, the lyric "Do what you want 'cause a pirate is free, you are a pirate" became an oft-quoted meme in YouTube Poop and hacker culture, most often in reference to online piracy via LimeWire. 

Around 2016, Robbie Rotten rose to internet fame through the song "We Are Number One". The Reddit forum r/dankmemes voted Robbie Rotten "Meme of the Year" in 2016.

On August 21, 2018, his actor Stefán Karl Stefánsson died of bile duct cancer at the age of 43.

References

Television characters introduced in 2004
Fictional singers
LazyTown
Internet memes
Internet memes introduced in 2016
Film and television memes
Fictional Icelandic people
Theatre characters introduced in 1999